General Villegas is a town in General Villegas Partido, Buenos Aires Province, Argentina.

UN/LOCODE is ARVGS.

Climate

References

External links

 Municipal website

Populated places in Buenos Aires Province
Cities in Argentina
Argentina